Euonymus angulatus is a species of tree in the family Celastraceae. It is endemic to India, where it is known from Karnataka, Kerala, and Tamil Nadu. It is threatened by habitat loss.

References

Endemic flora of India (region)
angulatus
Vulnerable plants
Taxonomy articles created by Polbot